Lucien Cujean (born 16 August 1989 in Versoix) is a Swiss sailor. He and Sébastien Schneiter placed 13th in the 49er event at the 2016 Summer Olympics, and 14th in the 49er event at the 2020 Summer Olympics.

References

External links
 
 
 
 

1989 births
Living people
Swiss male sailors (sport)
Olympic sailors of Switzerland
Sailors at the 2016 Summer Olympics – 49er
Sailors at the 2020 Summer Olympics – 49er